The World Society for Virology was established in 2017 in order to link different virologists worldwide in an official society with no restriction based on income or physical location.

Mission
The society's mission is to strengthen research on viruses affecting humans, animals, plants and other organisms.

Membership
WSV has more than 1,600 members from 96 countries. Membership is open for all including scientists, researchers, postgraduate students who involved in virology research. Membership is offered without annual fee.

Partner societies
The society is currently a partner of the following virology societies:
Indian Virological Society
Colombian Association for Virology
Mexican Virology Networking
Finnish Society for Study of Infectious Diseases
Societas biochemica, biophysica et microbiologica Fenniae
Chinese Society for Virology (Division of the Chinese Society for Microbiology)
La Société Marocaine de Virologie (SMaV)
Swedish Society for Virology
Middle East, Eurasia And Africa Influenza Stakeholders Network (ME'NA-ISN)
Spanish Society for Virology
Brazilian Society for Virology
Korean Society of Virology

Scientific organizations
The Global Foot-and-Mouth (FMD) Research Alliance (GFRA)
Global African Swine Fever Research Alliance

Affiliated journals
Virology, a scientific journal published by Elsevier, is the official journal of the society, while Tumour Virus Research, also published by Elsevier, is an affiliated journal.

Other organizations

WSV meetings
First Committee Meeting, 25–27 August 2019 in Stockholm, Sweden at the Karolinska University Hospital.

First international conference: Tackling global virus epidemics, in June 16–18, 2021, which was held virtually.

Affiliated textbooks
Emerging and transboundary animal viruses.

Animal-Origin Viral Zoonoses.

Affiliated articles

Tracing the origin of Severe acute respiratory syndrome Coronavirus-2 (SARS-CoV-2): A systematic review and narrative synthesis.

Reemerging human monkeypox: a major public-health debacle.

Transmission dynamics and mutational prevalence of the novel SARS-CoV-2 Omicron Variant of Concern.

Characterization of the novel SARS-CoV-2 Omicron (B.1.1.529) Variant of Concern and its global perspective.

Presidents of the WSV

References

External links

Scientific organizations established in 2017
Virology organizations